Giuseppe Scalera (born 26 January 1998) is an Italian football player who plays as a defender for Viterbese.

Club career
He made his professional debut in the Serie B for Bari on 17 December 2016 in a game against Avellino.

On 10 January 2019, he joined Sambenedettese on loan. However, the league refused to register the contract with Sambenedettese as it would have been his fourth club of the 2018–19 season. The lawyers argued that the Bari contract and aborted July loan to Pistoiese should not count as Bari went bankrupt soon after, making the player a free agent, but the league rejected that argument and Scalera had to return to Pescara.

On 1 August 2019, he signed with Viterbese.

References

External links
 

1998 births
Sportspeople from the Metropolitan City of Bari
Footballers from Apulia
Living people
Italian footballers
Association football defenders
S.S.C. Bari players
S.S. Fidelis Andria 1928 players
Delfino Pescara 1936 players
U.S. Viterbese 1908 players
Serie B players
Serie C players